Southern Transylvania was a region of the Kingdom of Romania between 1940 and 1944, during World War II. The region of Transylvania, belonging entirely to Romania when the war started in 1939, was split in 1940 between Romania and Hungary, with the latter taking Northern Transylvania in the aftermath of the Second Vienna Award.

Overview
Timișoara was the largest city in Southern Transylvania, with a population of 116,878 as of April 1941. However, this city was located in the Banat sub-region. The largest city in Southern Transylvania-proper was Brașov, with a population of 84,557 as of April 1941. Southern Transylvania-proper had a population of just over 1.74 million people. 

Southern Transylvania (including its adjacent regions to its West) had a total area of 59,000 square kilometers. Subtracting from this area the areas of the five counties to its West: Timiș-Torontal (7,600 square km), Caraș (4,693), Severin (6,422 square km), Arad (6,248 square km) and the half of Bihor (~3,700 square km) which remained in Romania after the Second Vienna Award, the area of Southern Transylvania-proper amounted to just over 30,000 square km.

Armaments industry

The following is a list of weapons produced during World War II and the years prior throughout the Romanian (Southern) part of Transylvania-proper.

Weapons

Transylvanian monthly armament production (October 1942)

Aircraft (armed)
IAR 80 (448 built)
IAR 37 (220 built)
IAR 79/SM.79 (67 built) 
Potez 25 (184 built)
Messerschmitt Bf 109 (17 built)
PZL P.11 (95 built)
PZL P.24 (25 built)

Ammunition
There were factories for the assembly and filling of artillery shells at Orăștie, Avrig and Copșa Mică. The one at Avrig was the largest, accounting for up to 40% of the total Romanian production of artillery shells. In 1942, the Nitramonia plant in Făgăraș started producing explosives.

Armored fighting vehicle components
Two Transylvanian factories, Industria Sârmei in Turda and IAR in Brașov, along with one factory outside Transylvania (Concordia in Ploiești), were responsible for the production of the torsion bars and wheels used in the manufacturing of the TACAM T-60 tank destroyers. The Astra Works in Brașov, together with the Lemaitre Works in Bucharest, were responsible for the finishing of the gun carriages used by the TACAM T-60 tank destroyers (the carriages were designed and cast at Concordia). For Romania's Renault R35 tanks, IAR in Brașov finished the cylinder heads and drive shafts which were cast at the Basarab Works in Bucharest.

Artillery components
The Astra Works produced gun barrels for Romania's Skoda 150 mm and 100 mm howitzers.

References 

20th century in Transylvania
 Historical regions in Romania
 Romania in World War II